Bagh Dai may refer to:

Bagh Dai-ye Olya
Bagh Dai-ye Sofla